is a department store chain in the Chūbu region of Japan. It is headquartered in Nagoya, Japan and owned by the Meitetsu rail company. The main store is located above Meitetsu Nagoya Station in Nakamura Ward and first opened in December 1954.

External links 

 Official homepage(In Japanese)

Department stores of Japan
Companies listed on the Nagoya Stock Exchange
Companies based in Nagoya
Sakae, Nagoya
Meitetsu Group
Japanese companies established in 1954
Retail companies established in 1954